Grevillea rivularis, commonly known as Carrington Falls grevillea, is a species of flowering plant in the family Proteaceae and is endemic to New South Wales. It is a dense, spreading shrub with divided leaves with more or less linear, sharply-pointed lobes, and clusters of cream-coloured flowers that turn pink or grey as they age.

Description
The edges of the leaves are rolled under, almost enclosing the lower surface apart from the midvein.

Taxonomy
Grevillea rivularis was first formally described in 1975 by Lawrie Johnson and Donald McGillivray in the journal Telopea from specimens collected in 1960 at Carrington Falls by Ernest Francis Constable. The specific epithet (rivularis) means "a small stream".

Distribution and habitat
Carrington Falls grevillea grows with other shrubs along creeks and is restricted to Carrington Falls in Budderoo National Park.

Conservation status
The species is listed as "endangered" under the Australian Government Environment Protection and Biodiversity Conservation Act 1999 and the New South Wales Government Biodiversity Conservation Act 2016. The main threats to the species include its small population size, road and trail management, and inappropriate fire regimes.

References

rivularis
Flora of New South Wales
Proteales of Australia
Plants described in 1975
Taxa named by Lawrence Alexander Sidney Johnson
Taxa named by Donald McGillivray